André Marguerite Guillaume Kempinaire (26 January 1929 – 8 September 2012) was a Belgian liberal politician for the Party for Freedom and Progress (PVV).

Kempinaire is a doctor in Law and a lawyer. He was a member of the Belgian Federal Parliament (1965–1968 and 1971–1991) for the PVV in the district Kortrijk and became State Secretary for public office (1976–1977), minister of the Flemish community (1980), and State Secretary of foreign trade (1981–1985), and of development cooperation (1985–1989).

References

Sources
 André Kempinaire (Council of Europe)

1929 births
Belgian politicians
Flemish activists
2012 deaths
People from Hasselt
Flemish lawyers